is a Japanese former professional boxer who competed from 2003 to 2017. a former WBC Super featherweight Champion. He was born in the Akita Prefecture and lives in Tokyo.

Professional career

Miura vs. Diaz 
Miura won the WBC super featherweight title from Mexican Gamaliel Díaz via a ninth round TKO in the latter's first title defence in Tokyo at the Kokugikan on April 8, 2013.

Miura vs. Vargas 
He made four title defences before losing his belt in 2015 to Francisco Vargas, in a potential fight of the year candidate.

Miura vs. Roman 
On January 28, 2017, Miura knocked out Miguel Roman, ranked #2 by the WBC and #6 by the WBA at super feathweight, in the 12th round of their fight to earn a second shot at the WBC Super featherweight title, was held by Miguel Berchelt who defeated Vargas for the belt later that same evening.

Miura vs. Berchelt 
On July 15, 2017, Miura challenged Miguel Berchelt for his WBC super featherweight belt. Berchelt won convincingly on all three scorecards, 120-109, 119-108 and 116-111.

Professional boxing record 

{|class="wikitable" style="text-align:center; font-size:95%"
|-
!No.
!Result
!Record
!Opponent
!Type
!Round
!Date
!Location
!Notes

|- align=center
|37
|Loss
|31–4–2
|align=left| Miguel Berchelt
|UD
|12
|2017-07-15
|align=left|
|align=left|
|- align=center
|36
|Win
|31–3–2
|align=left| Miguel Roman
|KO
|12 (12), 
|2017-01-28
|align=left|
|align=left|
|- align=center
|35
|Win
|30–3–2
|align=left| Jimmy Borbon
|KO
|1 (10), 
|2016-05-10
|align=left|
|align=left|
|- align=center
|34
|Loss
|29–3–2
|align=left| Francisco Vargas
|TKO
|9 (12), 
|2015-11-21
|align=left|
|align=left|
|- align=center
|33
|Win
|29–2–2
|align=left| Billy Dib
|TKO
|3 (12), 
|2015-05-01
|align=left|
|align=left|
|- align=center
|32
|Win
|28–2–2
|align=left| Edgar Puerta
|TKO
|6 (12), 
|2014-11-22
|align=left|
|align=left|
|- align=center
|31
|Win
|27–2–2
|align=left| Dante Jardón
|TKO
|9 (12), 
|2013-12-31
|align=left|
|align=left|
|- align=center
|30
|Win
|26–2–2
|align=left| Sergio Thompson
|UD
|12
|2013-08-17
|align=left|
|align=left|
|- align=center
|29
|Win
|25–2–2
|align=left| Gamaliel Díaz
|TKO
|9 (12), 
|2013-04-08
|align=left|
|align=left|
|- align=center
|28
|Win
|24–2–2
|align=left| Ryuji Migaki
|TKO
|1 (10), 
|2012-10-27
|align=left|
|align=left|
|- align=center
|27
|Win
|23–2–2
|align=left| Desson Cag-ong
|TKO
|2 (8), 
|2012-06-02
|align=left|
|align=left|
|- align=center
|26
|Win
|22–2–2
|align=left| RJ Ano-os
|UD
|8
|2012-02-04
|align=left|
|align=left|
|- align=center
|25
|Win
|21–2–2
|align=left| Jorge Perez
|UD
|10
|2011-10-18
|align=left|
|align=left|
|- align=center
|24
|Loss
|20–2–2
|align=left| Takashi Uchiyama
|RTD
|8 (12), 
|2011-01-31
|align=left|
|align=left|
|- align=center
|23
|Win
|20–1–2
|align=left| Takashi Inagaki
|TKO
|9 (10), 
|2010-10-02
|align=left|
|align=left|
|- align=center
|22
|Win
|19–1–2
|align=left| Hiroto Takeshita
|TKO
|3 (10), 
|2010-06-05
|align=left|
|align=left|
|- align=center
|21
|Win
|18–1–2
|align=left| Seiichi Okada
|SD
|10
|2010-02-06
|align=left|
|align=left|
|- align=center
|20
|Win
|17–1–2
|align=left| Masayuki Koguchi
|UD
|10
|2009-10-10
|align=left|
|align=left|
|- align=center
|19
|Win
|16–1–2
|align=left| Yoshimitsu Yashiro
|TKO
|7 (10), 
|2009-07-04
|align=left|
|align=left|
|- align=center
|18
|style="background: #B0C4DE"|Draw
|15–1–2
|align=left| Yoshimitsu Yashiro
|PTS
|10
|2009-01-17
|align=left|
|align=left|
|- align=center
|17
|Win
|15–1–1
|align=left| Daochai Sithsoei
|KO
|3 (8), 
|2008-10-06
|align=left|
|align=left|
|- align=center
|16
|Win
|14–1–1
|align=left| Insee Sithkawpon 1996
|KO
|1 (8), 
|2008-06-04
|align=left|
|align=left|
|- align=center
|15
|Win
|13–1–1
|align=left| Daorung Sithsoei
|KO
|2 (8), 
|2008-03-03
|align=left|
|align=left|
|- align=center
|14
|Loss
|12–1–1
|align=left| Yusuke Kobori
|UD
|10
|2007-09-15
|align=left|
|align=left|
|- align=center
|13
|Win
|12–0–1
|align=left| Mongkolchai Saendeegym
|KO
|2 (8), 
||2007-04-14
|align=left|
|align=left|
|- align=center
|12
|Win
|11–0–1
|align=left| Denlangoo Tor Tiebkoon
|UD
|8
|2006-11-18
|align=left|
|align=left|
|- align=center
|11
|Win
|10–0–1
|align=left| Hidekazu Matsunobu
|KO
|7 (10), 
|2006-07-01
|align=left|
|align=left|
|- align=center
|10
|Win
|9–0–1
|align=left| Kentaro Ogura
|KO
|1 (8), 
|2006-03-04
|align=left|
|align=left|
|- align=center
|9
|Win
|8–0–1
|align=left| Phongpetch Chuwatana
|TKO
|1 (8), 
|2005-12-07
|align=left|
|align=left|
|- align=center
|8
|Win
|7–0–1
|align=left| Bunchai Kiatpailin
|TKO
|5 (8), 
|2005-09-22
|align=left|
|align=left|
|- align=center
|7
|Win
|6–0–1
|align=left| Singsamut Eausampan
|TKO
|6 (8), 
|2005-04-28
|align=left|
|align=left|
|- align=center
|6
|style="background: #B0C4DE"|Draw
|5–0–1
|align=left| Akinori Suzuki
|PTS
|8
|2004-12-04
|align=left|
|align=left|
|- align=center
|5
|Win
|5–0
|align=left| Hideki Tanaka
|TKO
|3 (8), 
|2004-08-07
|align=left|
|align=left|
|- align=center
|4
|Win
|4–0
|align=left| Sardtora Saendeegym
|KO
|1 (8), 
|2004-05-12
|align=left|
|align=left|
|- align=center
|3
|Win
|3–0
|align=left| Osamu Nakamura
|TKO
|3 (8), 
|2004-02-26
|align=left|
|align=left|
|- align=center
|2
|Win
|2–0
|align=left| Padejsuek Twingym
|KO
|1 (6), 
|2003-09-09
|align=left|
|align=left|
|- align=center
|1
|Win
|1–0
|align=left| Yutaka Sato
|UD
|6
|2003-07-12
|align=left|
|align=left|

See also 
List of WBC world champions
List of super featherweight boxing champions
List of Japanese boxing world champions
Boxing in Japan

References

External links 

 
Takashi Miura - Profile, News Archive & Current Rankings at Box.Live

World Boxing Council champions
World super-featherweight boxing champions
Sportspeople from Akita Prefecture
1984 births
Living people
Japanese male boxers